Astro Warna is a 24-hour Malaysian television network in Malaysia. Launch On 1 June 2009, this channel airs local and international comedy programs. It is broadcast on the Astro satellite television platform as part of the Mustika Pack via Channel 132.

Before launching Astro Warna, all local comedy programs were shown on either Astro Ria or Astro Prima. After launching Astro Warna, almost all local comedy programs shown on their existing Malay channels moved to Astro Warna, although some programs such as Raja Lawak Astro continued to be shown on Astro Prima for its fourth and fifth season, before moving to Astro Warna in its sixth season.

Astro Warna HD is the simulcast HD version of Astro Warna. It was launched on 11 May 2017 for all Astro customers that subscribed to HD service with Mustika Pack on channel 124. Previously, their programs on HD were shown on Astro Mustika HD, leaving the latter to focus on their other two channels. Astro Mustika HD has rebranded to Astro Citra HD on 1 October 2018, but, they moved to channel 126 in this situation.

Programmes

Local programmes
 Spontan
 Gerabak
 Ten Ten Ten
 Ek Eleh
 Impak Minima
 Kampung Jaguh
 Tetangga
 Elak Elak
 Maharaja Lawak
 Raja Lawak S6
 Raja Lawak S7
 Redah Kasi Pecah
 Redah Kasi Pecah Ekstravaganza
 Betul Ke Bohong?
 Super Spontan 2012
 Super Spontan 2013
 Karoot Komedia
 Karoot Komedia X S1
 Karoot Komedia X S2
 Maharaja Lawak Mega 2011
 Maharaja Lawak Mega 2012
 Sembang Teh Tarik
 Wartawan Kampung
 Maharaja Lawak Mega 2013
 Super Spontan 2014
 Anugerah Lawak Warna
 Sembang Teh Tarik S2
 Keluarga Iskandar S2 (also aired on Astro Mustika HD)
 Maharaja Lawak Mega 2014 (also aired on Astro Mustika HD and Astro Prima)
 Ini Malam Kita Punya (Malaysian version of See U Tonight format)
 Di Balik Tawa
 The Masked Singer Malaysia (Malaysian version of Masked Singer)

Foreign programmes
 The Simpsons
 Malcolm in the Middle
 Running Man
 The Loud House
 Mechamato
 Yes, Dear Dharma & Greg Sabrina the Teenage Witch Tetangga (Seasons 1 & 2) Zero Downpayment Erlin Montel 2 x 5 Dol (Seasons 1 & 2) Fiesta Komedi Kadir & Kadir CMYK''

See also
 Astro Citra

References

Astro Malaysia Holdings television channels
Television channels and stations established in 2009